Miguel Ángel Bernardeau Duato (born 12 December 1996) is a Spanish actor.

Biography
Miguel Ángel Bernardeau Duato was born on 12 December 1996 in Valencia, Spain. He is the son of television producer, Miguel Ángel Bernardeau Maestro and the actress, Ana Duato. He has a younger sister, named María Bernardeau Duato. He studied Dramatic Art in the United States, at Santa Monica College and acting at the American Academy of Dramatic Arts in Los Angeles, California.

Personal life 
In 2018, Miguel Bernardeau started a relationship with Spanish singer Aitana, which they confirmed in August 2019 through their Instagram accounts. They posed together for the first time in February 2020 at Milan Fashion Week, where they attended the show as guests. They lived together from September 2021 to December 2022, when he reportedly moved out after the end of the relationship.

Filmography

Television

Film

Awards and nominations

References

External links 
 

1996 births
Living people
People from Valencia
Spanish male television actors
Spanish male film actors
Santa Monica College alumni
American Academy of Dramatic Arts alumni
21st-century Spanish male actors